Serres-Morlaàs is a commune in the Pyrénées-Atlantiques department in south-western France.

See also

 Communes of the Pyrénées-Atlantiques department

References

Communes of Pyrénées-Atlantiques